Aruba is a 2006 Canadian coming-of-age dramatic short film and the fiction debut of director Hubert Davis. It was his first major work after his Academy Award-nominated film Hardwood.

Davis was inspired to create the film after having worked with "at risk kids" in Vancouver, and toward his film addressing issues found within Black communities, he "advocates the need for 'intelligent urban films' that offer a different perspective from the conventions of urban comedies and Black Entertainment TV."

The film has been archived in the National Film Board of Canada African-Canadian Issues Collection.

Premise
Milan (A.J. Saudin) is an 11-year-old boy who dreams about escaping a violent home life.  When his parents fight or take drugs, or when bullies pick on him in school, he finds peace in contemplating a postcard with an idyllic picture of the island of Aruba, and imagines himself in that faraway place as a way to survive.

Cast
 A.J. Saudin as Milan
 Devon Bostick as Mark
 Soo Garay as Mom
 Patricia Fagen as Teacher
 Nicki Whitely as Student
 Chris McCawley as Student
 Megan Dexter as Bully #2
 Drew Gardiner as Bully #3

Release

Screenings
The film premiered at the Sundance Film Festival in January 2006, and then screened at several festivals, including the 2006 Toronto International Film Festival, the 2006 Palm Springs International ShortFest, the 2007 Seattle International Film Festival, and the 2008 Kansas City Jubilee Film Festival.  Of its screening at the Vancouver International Film Festival, Mark Harris of Straight.com called the film "desperately touching".

DVD
Aruba was released by Paradox on January 21, 2008, as part of the compilation DVD "And the Winner Is...", a collection of multiple award-winning short films which also included the films Ryan (2004), The Danish Poet (2006), Strange Invaders (2002), Walking (1969), Hardwood (2004), and My Grandmother Ironed the King's Shirts (1999).

Reception
The National Film Board of Canada wrote that the film is one about salvation and "a reflection of a part of our Canadian landscape too often ignored". They write that the film deals with children whose parents come from different cultures, and is reflective "of a new Canada" by its offering "a new perspective into the Canadian culture" through its approach on how race and poverty disconnect from the mainstream.

The Manitoba Library Association's CM Magazine wrote that the film reflected "the diversity of worlds and cultures that are a part of the inner city", through its "choosing to highlight the effects of poverty, violence, and abuse on one urban family".  They offered that the film's strength was through limiting its dialogue and relying on visual narrative to allow "viewers to bring their thoughts and feelings to the images." They recommend it for classroom use to open discussion on "topics including bullying, poverty, drug abuse, domestic violence, and the struggles of many inner-city children," and offer grade 7-12 study guide.

In a retrospective of Hubert Davis' short works, Aruba, Truth and Hardwood screened at the Toronto's NFB Mediatheque in November 2011.

Awards and nominations
2006, Won the Panavision Grand Jury Award at Palm Springs International ShortFest

References

External links
Aruba (2006) at the Internet Movie Database
Educator's guide at the National Film Board of Canada

2006 short films
2006 films
National Film Board of Canada short films
Quebec films
Films directed by Hubert Davis
Canadian independent films
Films shot in Toronto
Films about child abuse
Canadian coming-of-age drama films
2000s English-language films
Canadian drama short films
2000s Canadian films